Thyella Filotas Football Club is a Greek football club based in Filotas, Florina, Greece.

The club was founded in 1952.

Honours

Domestic
 Florina Regional Championship: 2
 1987–88, 2013–14
 Florina Regional Cup: 1 
 2013–14

External links
www.filotasfc.gr

Association football clubs established in 1952
1952 establishments in Greece